San Marino competed at the 1972 Summer Olympics in Munich, West Germany. Seven competitors, all men, took part in four events in two sports.

Cycling

One cyclist represented San Marino in 1972.

Individual road race
 Daniele Cesaretti — did not finish (→ no ranking)

Shooting

Six shooters represented San Marino in 1972.

25 m pistol
 Bruno Morri - 570pts (47th place).
 Roberto Tamagnini - Withdrew.

50 m rifle, three positions
 Italo Casali - 1026pts (65th place).
 Libero Casali - 997pts (68th place).

Trap
 Silvano Raganini - 186pts (24th place).
 Guglielmo Giusti - 175pts (43rd place).

References

External links
Official Olympic Reports
San Marino NOC.

Nations at the 1972 Summer Olympics
1972 Summer Olympics
Summer Olympics